Bilal Moussa (born 29 November 1996) is a Togolese footballer who plays as a left-back for AS Togo-Port and the Togo national team.

International career
Moussa made his debut with the Togo national team in a 2–1 2020 African Nations Championship win over Uganda on 22 January 2021.

References

External links
 
 

1996 births
Living people
Togolese footballers
Togo international footballers
Association football fullbacks
Togolese expatriate footballers
Togolese expatriates in Senegal
Expatriate footballers in Senegal
21st-century Togolese people
Togo A' international footballers
2020 African Nations Championship players
AS Togo-Port players